Winter Harbor is a census-designated place (CDP) in the town of Winter Harbor in Hancock County, Maine, United States. The CDP population was 426 at the 2010 census, out of 516 people in the town as a whole.

Geography
The Winter Harbor CDP is the main village within the town of Winter Harbor on Mount Desert Island. It is situated at the north end of the harbor of the same name, an arm on the east side of Frenchman Bay. Maine State Route 186 is the primary road through the community. The CDP extends east along Route 186 to Moore Road, the western entrance to the loop road around the Schoodic Peninsula. To the north, the CDP includes the small community of Gerrishville. The CDP is bordered to the west by Frenchman Bay and extends south to include all of Grindstone Neck between Frenchman Bay and the Winter Harbor inlet. Route 186 leads north  to U.S. Route 1 at West Gouldsboro and east  to Prospect Harbor.

Demographics

References

Census-designated places in Maine
Census-designated places in Hancock County, Maine